"Last Will and Temperament" (also known as "Boot to the Head" or "Mr. Muldoon's Will") is a comedy skit performed by the Canadian comedy troupe The Frantics on their CBC radio series "Frantic Times". It appears on their 1984 album of the same name.  The sketch introduced the phrase "boot to the head" that would become their catchphrase, appearing in the sketch "Ti Kwan Leep" three years later in their album Boot to the Head.

Premise
The premise is that the last will of Arthur Durham Muldoon is being read by a lawyer, to Muldoon's overly emotional sister Jenny, her timid husband Hank, his drunken brother Hedge, his know-it-all-nephew Ralston, and Muldoon's caretaker Mrs. Mulroy. All are present for this reading and everyone thinks they are getting a piece of his fortune, but as the will is read aloud, they learn that Muldoon has only bequeathed them a "boot to the head" (with the exception of Hedge, who also receives three crates of whiskey and the contents of Muldoon's wine cellar), the lawyer character kicking them physically in the head (illustrated with a prop leg hitting them from off screen). Every attending member, including Muldoon's cat, receives a boot to the head, though Jenny and Hank each receive an additional boot for every "inheritance" bequeathed per Muldoon's order.

Muldoon leaves not a boot to the head to his lawyer, but a rabid Tasmanian devil down his trousers, and in the midst of this, announces that Mr. Muldoon's entire CDN $10 million fortune will be given to the city of Calgary, Alberta "so they can afford to move somewhere decent." Finally, the lawyer announces that Muldoon is leaving them each a lifetime supply of ice cream, to which Mrs. Mulroy asks "What flavor is it?" The lawyer replies "Boot to the head!" and each receives one final kick.

Sometimes, when this airs on Dr. Demento's radio program, it is followed by the theme song "Boot to the Head" from said 1987 album.

Cast
Paul Chato - Lawyer
Rick Green - Ralston
Dan Redican - Hedge
Peter Wildman - Hank
Carolyn Scott (guest star) - Jenny, Ms. Mulroy

Television version
The television version, as seen in the second episode of their CBC Television series Four on the Floor (known as "The Frantics" outside Canada) is one minute shorter than the radio and album version, and does not include the wine cellar for Hedge (just the three cases of whiskey) nor does it include the nephew Ralston, the Tasmanian Devil joke or the ice cream punchline. Additionally, Rick Green dresses in drag to play Ms. Mulroy and Jenny's husband is renamed Chester.

References

External links
 The Frantics web site
 The "Four on the Floor" version of "Last Will and Temperament"
 The Last Will and Temperament sketch as written

Canadian comedy
Comedy sketches